Rash, also known as Coffeys Store, is an unincorporated community in Jackson County, Alabama, United States.

History
A post office called Rash was established in 1901, and remained in operation until it was discontinued in 1956. The community was named for a local resident, William Rash, and was also home to a local business, Coffey's Store. Rash has been noted for its unusual place name.

References

Unincorporated communities in Jackson County, Alabama
Unincorporated communities in Alabama